Andrea Trinchieri (born August 6, 1968) is an Italian professional basketball coach. He is the current head coach for Bayern Munich of the Basketball Bundesliga (BBL).

Coaching career

Clubs
Trinchieri was the assistant head coach with the Italian League club Olimpia Milano from 1998 to 2004. He then became the head coach of the Italian club Vanoli Basket from 2004 to 2007. He helped Vanoli get promoted from the Italian 3rd Division to the Italian Second Division. After that, he was the head coach of the Italian club Juvecaserta Basket, which was also in the Italian Second Division at that time.

His next head coaching job was also in the Italian Second Division, with Veroli Basket, during the 2008–09 season. With Veroli Basket, he won the Italian Second Division Cup title, and he was named the Italian Second Division's Coach of the Year in 2009.

After that, he became the head coach of the Italian team Cantù. As the head coach of Cantù, he was named the Italian League Coach of the Year in both 2010 and 2011. He also won the Italian Supercup with Cantù, in the 2012–13 season. In 2013, he became the head coach of the Russian VTB United League club UNICS Kazan. With UNICS, he was the European-wide 2nd-tier level league EuroCup's Coach of the Year in the 2013–14 season.

In July 2014, it was announced that Trinchieri would be the new head coach of the German club Brose Bamberg. On October 4, 2015, he extended his contract with the club, until the end of the 2016–17 season. With Brose, he won the German national league championship, the Basketball Bundesliga, in the 2014–15, 2015–16, and 2016-2017 seasons. On February 19, 2018, Trinchieri was released from his head coaching position with Brose, after the team lost 12 of their last 15 games.

On November 1, 2018, Trinchieri was named a head coach of the Serbian club Partizan, signing a three-year deal. On July 2, 2020, Trinchieri parted ways with Partizan, with whom he won 2018–19 and 2019–20 Radivoj Korać Cup seasons, and 2019 ABA League Supercup.

Greece national team
It was announced on January 2, 2013, by the Hellenic Basketball Federation, that Trinchieri would coach the Greece men's national basketball team for the next 2 years. In June 2014, he was replaced as Greece's head coach by Fotis Katsikaris, even though Trinchieri still had a valid contract as the team's head coach.

Coaching record

EuroLeague

|- 
| align="left"|Cantù
| align="left"|2011–12
| 16 || 8 || 8 ||  || align="center"|Eliminated in Top 16 stage
|- 
| align="left"|Cantù
| align="left"|2012–13
| 10 || 3 || 7 ||  || align="center"|Eliminated in group stage
|- 
| align="left"|Bamberg
| align="left"|2015–16
| 24 || 13 || 11 ||  || align="center"|Eliminated in Top 16 stage
|- 
| align="left"|Bamberg
| align="left"|2016–17
| 30 || 10 || 20 ||  || align="center"|Eliminated in regular season
|- 
| align="left"|Bamberg
| align="left"|2017–18
| 22 || 8 || 14 ||  || align="center"|Fired
|-
| align="left"|Munich
| align="left"|2020–21
| 39 || 23 || 16 ||  || align="center"|Eliminated in Top 8 playoff stage
|-
| align="left"|Munich
| align="left"|2021-22
|36 || 16 || 20 ||  || align="center"|Eliminated in Top 8 playoff stage
|-class="sortbottom"
| align="center" colspan=2|Career||177||81||96||||

Personal life
Trinchieri's family is international. His mother is from Croatia and his grandmother is from Montenegro. His father, Paolo Trinchieri, is from America and Panama, and his grandfather, Alfredo Trinchieri, was a diplomat from Italy.

Awards and accomplishments
 Italian Second Division Cup Winner: (2009)
 Italian Second Division Coach of the Year: (2009)
 2× Italian League Coach of the Year: (2010, 2011)
 Italian Supercup Winner: (2012)
 Russian Cup Winner: (2014)
 EuroCup Coach of the Year: (2014)
 3× German League Champion: (2015, 2016, 2017)
 German Supercup Winner: (2015)
 2x German Cup Winner: (2017), (2021)
 2× Serbian Cup Winner: (2019, 2020)
 ABA League Supercup Winner: (2019)

See also 
 List of Radivoj Korać Cup-winning head coaches

References

External links

 Andrea Trinchieri at euroleague.net
 Andrea Trinchieri at legabasket.it 

1968 births
Living people
BC UNICS coaches
Brose Baskets coaches
Greece national basketball team coaches
Italian expatriate basketball people in Germany
Italian expatriate basketball people in Greece
Italian expatriate basketball people in Serbia
Italian basketball coaches
Italian people of American descent
Italian people of Croatian descent
Italian people of Montenegrin descent
Juvecaserta Basket coaches
KK Partizan coaches
Pallacanestro Cantù coaches
Sportspeople from Milan
Vanoli Basket coaches
Veroli Basket coaches